The Awadh Punch (or Oudh Punch) was an Urdu satirical weekly published from Lucknow, India from 1877 to 1937, It was launched on Jan 16, 1877  and was founded and edited by Munshi Sajjad Husain.   It was modeled on Punch, a London-based weekly magazine from which it also derived its name. Some of its notable contributors were Ratan Nath Dhar Sarshar,  Syed Mohammad Azad, Tribhavan Nath Hijr, Machchu Baig Sitam Zareef, Javala Prashad Barq, Ahmed Ali Shauq Qidvai and Akbar Allahabadi.   The paper was one of the first to publish political satire, especially protesting British rule, in India.  It had to be closed down in 1912 but was revived in 1916 and it continued till, at least, Dec 1937.  
In the third and last attempt to revive it, this was published by Ahmad Jamal Pasha in 1959 and closed in 1962.

References

Weekly magazines published in India
1877 establishments in India
1936 disestablishments in India
Indian satire
Defunct magazines published in India